Epiecia is a genus of moths of the family Crambidae. It contains only one species, Epiecia externella, which is found in Australia, where it has been recorded from Queensland.

References

Pyraustinae
Crambidae genera
Taxa named by Francis Walker (entomologist)